Sreenath Subrahmanyam is a biologist and the director for the Institute of Bioecosciences, Virginia, United States of America.

Education 
Sreenath received his Bachelor's degree in Biological Sciences from Loyola College, Madras, and a PhD diploma in Biological Sciences from Cranfield University, UK. Sreenath is a Beahrs Fellow on the Natural Resources Management Program, University of California, Berkeley.

Research 
Sreenath worked on Environmental Impacts of the proposed lignite mine at Jayankondam. At Cranfield University, Sreenath developed a new approach for the computational design of molecular imprinting, which is followed by research groups around the world. Sreenath proposed that natural receptors can be used in bio-recognition, an idea which many researchers have successfully used in Biology. Sreenath works on climate change adaptation strategies  in Western Ghats, Indiacomputationally modelling tracheophytes and forest ecosystems. Sreenath is a Fellow of the Royal Society of Biology (FRSB),  and a Fellow of the Royal Society of Chemistry (FRSC).

Training Programs on Ecology and Conservation Biology 
Sreenath continues to direct a number of training programs such as the Young Advantage Program (YAP)  and the Environmental Leadership Program (ELP)

Popular contributions 
Environmental impacts of thermal power plant: Case Study

Salivary proteins of plant-feeding hemipteroids–implication in phytophagy

Application of natural receptors in sensors and assays

Analytical methods for determination of mycotoxins: a review

Ecological modelling of a wetland for phytoremediating Cu, Zn and Mn in a gold–copper mine site using Typha domingensis (Poales: Typhaceae) near Orange, NSW, Australia

Effective climate change adaptation strategies for biodiversity conservation

References

External links 

Sreenath Subrahmanyam's Training Programs on Ecology and Climate Change

Living people
Year of birth missing (living people)
Indian ecologists
UC Berkeley College of Natural Resources alumni
Scientists from Chennai
University of Madras alumni
Loyola College, Chennai alumni
alumni of Cranfield University
Indian expatriates in the United States
Fellows of the Royal Society of Biology
Fellows of the Royal Society of Chemistry
Environmental scientists